The Makikihi River is a river of the South Canterbury region of New Zealand's South Island.

The New Zealand Ministry for Culture and Heritage gives a translation of "cicada stream" for Mākikihi.

See also
List of rivers of New Zealand

References

 

Rivers of Canterbury, New Zealand
Rivers of New Zealand